The Asian Pacific American Bar Association Educational Fund (AEF) is a non-profit organization established by the Asian Pacific American Bar Association of the Greater Washington, D.C. Area, Inc. (APABA-DC) in 1993 to engage exclusively in charitable and educational activities.  In 2005, AEF established the Robert T. Matsui Annual Writing Competition.

References 

Educational organizations based in the United States
1993 establishments in Washington, D.C.
Organizations established in 1993